Bror Albert Öberg (24 August 1888 – 12 May 1990) was a Swedish athlete who competed at the 1912 Summer Olympics. In Stockholm he participated in the men's 10000 metres event, but was eliminated in the semi-finals after placing sixth, the only competitor to finish the race but not advance to the final. He was born in Härnösand and was a member of IFK Härnösand. He died in Gävle in 1990 at the age of 101.

References

External links
Albert Öberg's profile at the Swedish Olympic Committee 

1888 births
1990 deaths
Swedish male long-distance runners
Athletes (track and field) at the 1912 Summer Olympics
Olympic athletes of Sweden
Swedish centenarians
Men centenarians
People from Härnösand
Sportspeople from Västernorrland County